Bernard Glueck may refer to:

Bernard Glueck Sr. (1884–1972), Polish-American forensic psychiatrist and psychoanalyst; opened first prison psychiatric clinic, testified at the Leopold and Loeb trial, president of American Psychopathological Association
Bernard Glueck Jr. (1914–1999), American psychiatrist, published on transcendental meditation and preventive psychiatry

See also
Bernard Gluck, character played by Victor Buono on The Tony Randall Show
Glueck (disambiguation)